Turkey Ridge Creek is a stream in the U.S. state of South Dakota.

Turkey Ridge Creek takes its name from nearby Turkey Ridge, an elevation noted for its population of wild turkeys.

See also
List of rivers of South Dakota

References

Rivers of Hutchinson County, South Dakota
Rivers of Turner County, South Dakota
Rivers of South Dakota